Ah Pah Dam was a proposed dam on the Klamath River in the U.S. state of California proposed by the United States Bureau of Reclamation as part of its United Western Investigation study in 1951. It would stand almost as tall as the Transamerica Pyramid building in San Francisco, but would be much more massive. The tunnel would have been located near the southernmost extent of the reservoir. It was named in the language of the Yurok people.

References 
 Cadillac Desert, Marc Reisner, revised edition, Penguin US, (1993),

External links
Interim Report on Reconnaissance: California Division, United Western Investigation, Bureau of Reclamation
The Water Center's Watershed Review, University of Washington

Dams in California
History of Humboldt County, California
United States Bureau of Reclamation proposed dams